Tregony was a rotten borough in Cornwall which was represented in the Model Parliament of 1295, and returned two Members of Parliament to the English and later British Parliament continuously from 1562 to 1832, when it was abolished by the Great Reform Act.

History
The borough consisted of the town of Tregony. Like most of the Cornish boroughs enfranchised or re-enfranchised during the Tudor period, it was a settlement of little importance or wealth even to begin with, and was not incorporated as a municipal borough until sixty years after it began to return members to Parliament in 1563.

Tregony was a potwalloper borough, meaning that every (male) householder with a separate fireplace on which a pot could be boiled was entitled to vote. The apparently democratic nature of this arrangement was a delusion in a borough as small and poor as Tregony, where the residents could not afford to defy their landlord and, indeed, regarded their vote as a means of income. Many of the houses in the borough were built purely for political purposes, and the borough itself was bought and sold for its political value on numerous occasions. In the 1760s, Viscount Falmouth (head of the Boscawen family) influenced the nomination to one of the two seats and William Trevanion the other; later the Earl of Darlington controlled both seats, together with others in Cornwall, but by the time of the Great Reform Act the patronage had been transferred again, to James Adam Gordon.

In 1831, the borough had a population of 1,127, and 234 houses. Nevertheless, because of the wide franchise it had a comparatively large electorate for the time, between 260 and 300 voters.

Members of Parliament

MPs 1559–1629

MPs 1640–1832

Notes

References

D Brunton & D H Pennington, Members of the Long Parliament (London: George Allen & Unwin, 1954)
Cobbett's Parliamentary history of England, from the Norman Conquest in 1066 to the year 1803 (London: Thomas Hansard, 1808) 
 W D Pink, 'The Parliamentary History of Tregony', The Western Antiquary, Volume VI, Part V (1886), 117-121 
J Holladay Philbin, "Parliamentary Representation 1832 - England and Wales" (New Haven: Yale University Press, 1965)
Henry Stooks Smith, "The Parliaments of England from 1715 to 1847" (2nd edition, edited by FWS Craig - Chichester: Parliamentary Reference Publications, 1973)
 

Constituencies of the Parliament of the United Kingdom established in 1562
Constituencies of the Parliament of the United Kingdom disestablished in 1832
Parliamentary constituencies in Cornwall (historic)
Rotten boroughs